Louisiana Highway 106 (LA 106) is a state highway located primarily in Evangeline Parish that runs  in a west–east direction from LA 10 east of Oakdale to LA 29 south of Bunkie.  Along the way, LA 106 passes through the towns of Pine Prairie and St. Landry and intersects U.S. Highway 167 (US 167).  Near the east end of its route, LA 106 passes through an interchange with Interstate 49 (I-49) between Opelousas and Alexandria in the southwest corner of Avoyelles Parish.

Route description
It then skirts the northern border of Pine Prairie briefly and intersects LA 13 (Veterans Memorial Boulevard), which heads to Mamou on the south. LA 106 turns north and travels in a concurrency with LA 13 for less than a mile. At a four-way intersection, LA 13 continues north to Turkey Creek where it connects with US 167 to Alexandria; LA 3187 (Crooked Creek Parkway) begins to the west; and LA 106 turns to the east. Here it intersects US 167 which, apart from its aforementioned northerly destinations, heads south to Ville Platte, the seat of Evangeline Parish.

After another , LA 106 intersects LA 115 which parallels Bayou Cocodrie north to Lone Pine. Soon afterward, LA 106 crosses a bridge over the bayou and enters St. Landry. LA 106 then crosses the Acadiana Railway (AKDN) tracks and takes a sharp turn to the north out of town. It shortly resumes its northeastern course for  before crossing from Evangeline Parish into Avoyelles Parish.

In Avoyelles Parish, LA 106 turns east and passes through a diamond interchange with I-49 at Exit 46. I-49 heads to Alexandria on the north and Opelousas on the south.

LA 106 is an undivided, two-lane highway for its entire length, except for a brief portion that widens to a divided four-lane highway passing through the interchange with I-49.

History
In the original Louisiana Highway system in use between 1921 and 1955, the modern LA 106 made up parts of several routes, including State Route 482 from the western terminus at Beaver to Bayou Chicot; and State Route 23 to the eastern terminus at Milburn.

LA 106 was created with the 1955 Louisiana Highway renumbering, and its route has remained unchanged to the present day.

Major intersections

References

External links

La DOTD State, District, and Parish Maps

0106
Transportation in Evangeline Parish, Louisiana
Transportation in Avoyelles Parish, Louisiana